Yousuf Hussain Mohamed (born 8 July 1965), is a UAE football (soccer) player who played as a center back for the UAE national football team and Sharjah Club in Sharjah. He played in the 1990 FIFA World Cup, and now heading the technical committee in UAE football association in Sharjah.

Notes

External links
 
 

1965 births
Living people
Emirati footballers
1990 FIFA World Cup players
1992 AFC Asian Cup players
United Arab Emirates international footballers
UAE Pro League players
Sharjah FC players
Association football defenders